The Kim–Xi meetings are a series of summits between North Korea and China during 2018 and 2019. North Korean supreme leader Kim Jong-un secretly met with Chinese paramount leader Xi Jinping on March 25–28, 2018. Xi made a classified invitation to Kim to visit China, after which Kim visited Beijing and used his bullet proof train to travel to the three-day meeting. It is his first known out-of-country diplomatic trip since taking power. Kim and Xi had a second surprise meeting on May 7–8, 2018 in the city of Dalian. Kim and Xi had a third surprise meeting on June 19–20, 2018. They had a fourth surprise meeting on January 7–10, 2019 in Beijing, followed by a fifth official DPRK and China summit June 20–21, 2019 in the Forbidden City, Pyongyang.

First meeting

The first China–North Korea meeting in 2018 was organized by the invitation from Xi Jinping, General Secretary of the Communist Party of China. During the meeting between the two heads of state, Kim Jong-un officially invited Xi Jinping to Pyongyang at a time convenient for him, and Xi accepted the invitation.
During the confidential summit schedule, Xi presented and explained the list of the presents to Kim, who also prepared several gifts and described their details for Xi. Xi urged Kim to strengthen the strategic and diplomatic future partnership between China and North Korea. Kim stressed to Xi that North Korea and China are long-established socialist countries and that there are many ways to cooperate in various aspects in the future.

Reactions
Regarding North Korea nuclear weapons crisis with a diplomatic solution and Beijing's issue with US trade war, the two leaders meeting might be substantial leverage for answering to a puzzle of resolution to both two long-lasting socialist countries.

As regards Chinese state news agency, Xinhua, quoted Kim's statement "The issue of denuclearization of the Korean Peninsula is resolved, and South Korea and the United States respond to our efforts with goodwill, create an atmosphere of peace and stability while taking progressive and synchronous measures for the realization of peace. " President Trump's new national security advisor: John Bolton would not adopt the unreasonable solution - examples: sheer costs for North Korea's denuclearization (e.g., withdrawal of U.S. troops from the Korean peninsula or mutual denuclearization for both the DPRK and United States) after Kim-Xi summit.

Second meeting

Kim Jong-un met Xi Jinping for the second time in Dalian, Liaoning on May 7–8, 2018. The two leaders discussed how to cooperate at the communist level on denuclearization, and peace on the Korean peninsula. They also discussed China–DPRK relations and significant issues of common concern, Xinhua reported. U.S. President Trump emphasized that China should cooperate with the U.S.'s continued implementation of economic sanctions, with commercial and financial penalties on North Korea until it permanently dismantles its nuclear weapons and ICBM missile programs. This is the second time China's paramount leader Xi Jinping has met Kim Jong-un in two months, and Xi Jinping reaffirmed his state visit to Pyongyang by the end of 2018.

Third meeting

Kim Jong-un met with Xi Jinping in Beijing on June 19–20, 2018. Kim was speculated to have sought advice from Xi about a future, mutually beneficial negotiation strategy between the DPRK and  United States.

Fourth meeting

Kim Jong-un met with Xi Jinping in Beijing on January 7–10, 2019. The trip began on Kim's 35th birthday. It is suspected by many that Kim Jong-un was briefing Xi Jinping on the upcoming Trump-Kim summit in Hanoi, Vietnam and seeking advice. Kim transited China via train during the journey to Vietnam.

Fifth meeting

Xi Jinping visited Kim Jong-un in the North Korean capital of Pyongyang on 20–21 June 2019.  It was the first official visit by a Chinese leader to the country since Hu Jintao's visit 14 years prior and the first one for Xi personally since his visit to North Korea as Vice President and Politburo Standing Committee member in 2008. Xi Jinping was met at Pyongyang International Airport by Chairman Kim where he received full military honours including a 21-gun salute and a march-past by the Supreme Guard Command Honor Guard Battalion and the Central Military Band of the Korean People's Army. He also became the first Chinese leader to visit the Kumsusan Palace of the Sun. The following evening, Xi and Kim witnessed a performance of the Korean People's Army State Merited Chorus and Symphony Orchestra at the reopening of the 2019 Arirang Mass Games at Rungrado 1st of May Stadium.

See also
China–North Korea relations
2017–18 North Korea crisis
List of international trips made by Kim Jong-un
April 2018 inter-Korean summit
May 2018 inter-Korean summit
September 2018 inter-Korean summit
2018 North Korea–United States Singapore Summit
2019 North Korea–United States Hanoi Summit
Kim–Putin meetings
Nuclear power in North Korea

References

2018 in international relations
2018 in North Korea
2018 in China
March 2018 events in China
May 2018 events in Asia
2018 conferences
2010s in Beijing
China–North Korea relations
Diplomatic visits
Kim Jong-un
Xi Jinping